The Budweiser Events Center is a multi-purpose arena in Loveland, Colorado,  northeast of Denver. The arena is located on The Ranch Events Complex (formerly the Larimer County Fairgrounds and Events Complex) and is owned by Larimer County, Colorado and managed by Spectra Venue Management, and tickets are handled by ComcastTIX.

It is home to the Colorado Eagles ice hockey team and the former homes of the Colorado Lightning indoor soccer team, the Colorado Chill women's basketball team, and the Denver Dream women's football team. It was also home to the Colorado Ice/Crush indoor football team from 2007 until 2017.

It contains 777 club seats and 24 luxury suites.

History
Construction was completed and doors opened for the first event on September 20, 2003, with a sold-out exhibition hockey game between the Colorado Avalanche and the Florida Panthers.

The Colorado Eagles established a new record for minor league professional hockey with their 145th consecutive regular-season sellout, set on January 12, 2008, in a victory vs. rival Rocky Mountain Rage. Including playoff games, the Eagles had sold out 181 consecutive games total – every single game during their first 4½ years of operation.

Notable events
The Colorado Eagles hosted the 2009 Central Hockey League All-Star Game at the Budweiser Events Center.

The Events Center has played host to: musicians Widespread Panic, David Bowie, Rod Stewart, Yes, and ZZ Top; comedians Bill Cosby, Ron White, Carlos Mencia, Gabriel Iglesias & Larry the Cable Guy; as well as Cirque Du Soleil, Ringling Bros. Barnum & Bailey Circus, Disney on Ice, The Wiggles, Sesame Street Live, and The Harlem Globetrotters.

External links
Budweiser Events Center 
Loveland Chamber of Commerce

References

Indoor ice hockey venues in the United States
Sports venues in Colorado
Music venues in Colorado
Loveland, Colorado
Indoor soccer venues in the United States
Colorado Crush (IFL)
Buildings and structures in Larimer County, Colorado
Tourist attractions in Larimer County, Colorado
Culture of Fort Collins, Colorado
2003 establishments in Colorado
Sports venues completed in 2003
Basketball venues in Colorado
Indoor arenas in Colorado
Colorado Eagles